Consort Rong may refer to:

Consort Rong (Kangxi) (died 1727)
Consort Rong (Qianlong) (1734–1788)

See also
Fragrant Concubine, a legendary concubine of the Qianlong Emperor, likely based on Consort Rong